The 58th Annual Tony Awards were held June 6, 2004 at Radio City Music Hall and broadcast on CBS television. Hugh Jackman was the host.

The Awards telecast won the Creative Arts Primetime Emmy for Outstanding Variety, Music or Comedy Special, and Jackman won the Primetime Emmy Awards for Outstanding Individual Performance in a Variety or Music Program.

Wicked had the most nominations of the ceremony with 10, winning 3 of them, tying with Avenue Q, which won Best Musical, while the revival of Assassins won the most awards of the night with 5, including Best Revival of a Musical.

The ceremony
Hugh Jackman performed the opening number, "One Night Only" with the "Dynamites" from Hairspray, the "Radio" from Caroline, or Change, and the "Urchins" from Little Shop of Horrors, along with members of the casts of Avenue Q, The Boy from Oz, Fiddler on the Roof, Wonderful Town, and Wicked, and the Radio City Music Hall Rockettes. Tony Bennett performed "Lullaby of Broadway" and Mary J. Blige sang "What I Did for Love" from the Tony Awards Songbook.

Presenters were:
Carol Channing, Sean Combs, Taye Diggs, Edie Falco, Jimmy Fallon, Harvey Fierstein, Victor Garber, Joel Grey, Ethan Hawke, Anne Heche, Billy Joel, Scarlett Johansson, Nicole Kidman, Jane Krakowski, Peter Krause, Swoosie Kurtz, LL Cool J, Nathan Lane, Laura Linney, John Lithgow, Rob Marshall, Anne Meara, Brian Stokes Mitchell, Dame Helen Mirren, Sarah Jessica Parker, Anna Paquin, Bernadette Peters, Phylicia Rashad, Chita Rivera, John Rubenstein, Carole Bayer Sager, Martin Short, Patrick Stewart, Jerry Stiller, Sigourney Weaver, Marissa Jaret Winokur, and Renée Zellweger.

Shows that performed were:

New Musicals

Avenue Q - The company performed "It Sucks to Be Me"
The Boy from Oz - Hugh Jackman and members of the company performed "Not the Boy Next Door", with a special appearance by Sarah Jessica Parker
Caroline, or Change - Tonya Pinkins performed "Lot's Wife"
Wicked - Idina Menzel, Kristin Chenoweth and members of the company performed "Defying Gravity"

Revivals

Assassins - Members of the company performed "Everybody's Got the Right"
Fiddler on the Roof - Alfred Molina and company performed "Tradition"/"Bottle Dance"
Wonderful Town - Donna Murphy and members of the company performed "Swing!"

Winners and nominations
Winners are in bold

Special awards
Source: Playbill

 Regional Theatre Tony Award Winner - Cincinnati Playhouse in the Park
Special Tony Award for Lifetime Achievement in the Theatre Winner - James M. Nederlander
Tony Honors for Excellence in Theatre Winners
The cast of the 2003 Broadway production of Big RiverNancy Coyne
Frances & Harry Edelstein and Vincent Sardi, Jr.
Martha Swope

Multiple nominations and awards

These productions had multiple nominations:10 nominations: Wicked 7 nominations: Assassins 6 nominations: Avenue Q, Caroline, or Change, Fiddler on the Roof and Henry IV (a combination of Part 1 and Part 2) 5 nominations: The Boy from Oz and Wonderful Town4 nominations: Frozen, Jumpers, A Raisin in the Sun and Taboo 3 nominations: Bombay Dreams, I Am My Own Wife and The Retreat from Moscow 2 nominations: Anna in the Tropics, Big River, King Lear, Never Gonna Dance and Twentieth CenturyThe following productions received multiple awards.5 wins: Assassins3 wins: Avenue Q and Wicked 2 wins: Henry IV (a combination of Part 1 and Part 2), I Am My Own Wife and A Raisin in the Sun''

See also
 Drama Desk Awards
 2004 Laurence Olivier Awards – equivalent awards for West End theatre productions
 Obie Award
 New York Drama Critics' Circle
 Theatre World Award
 Lucille Lortel Awards

References

External links
2004 Tony Awards

Tony Awards ceremonies
2004 theatre awards
Tony
2004 in New York City
2000s in Manhattan
Television shows directed by Glenn Weiss